LP1 is the fifth studio album by English singer and songwriter Joss Stone. It was released on 21 July 2011 on Stone's own label, Stone'd Records, in partnership with Surfdog Records, following her departure from EMI in 2010. The album was recorded at Blackbird Studios in Nashville, Tennessee, in six days. Stone co-wrote and co-produced the album with record producer and Eurythmics co-founder, Dave Stewart.

To promote the album, Stone and Stewart performed on The Tonight Show with Jay Leno on 11 July 2011, on The Late Late Show with Craig Ferguson on 13 July and on Live! with Regis and Kelly on 14 July.

Critical reception

LP1 received mixed reviews from music critics. At Metacritic, which assigns a normalised rating out of 100 to reviews from mainstream publications, the album received an average score of 59, based on 18 reviews. Jon Pareles of The New York Times wrote, "For most of the album she lets her big, smoky voice rip into songs of all-out romantic strife" and that "[h]er voice is a loose cannon; LP1 figures out how to aim it." The Boston Globes Scott McLennan noted that the album "has bolder blues-rock and country undertones, and those platforms elevate the originality of Stone's raw talents." He further stated: "With her rich tone that is cut with a bit of rasp, Stone has the ability to inhabit songs the way good actors create characters." Stephen Thomas Erlewine of AllMusic stated that "Stewart is naturally reluctant to present Stone in a strictly soul setting; R&B is the foundation, but he dabbles in tight funk, folk, blues, Euro-rock, and modernist pop, giving LP1 just enough elasticity so it breathes and just enough color so it doesn't seem staid." Holly Gleason of Paste described the album as "a full-tumble of relentless musicianship, grit and soul" and compared it to Dusty Springfield's 1969 album Dusty in Memphis. She later concluded that "[i]n a world where machined dance fodder, rap-deckled pop and lumbering rawk dominates, a genuine article of soul music—especially one where the thick bass, tumbling Wurlitzer and bright guitars set the tone—is a joyous noise, indeed." The Guardians Paul MacInnes believed that the album is "proficiently played and Stone's voice has a range and tonal dexterity that few of her peers possess", but "the final product is so familiar and so shorn of genuine emotion that LP1 quickly loses any sense of identity and becomes standard fare, indistinguishable from any number of other recordings." Colin McGuire agreed in his review for PopMatters, and said that the album is "missing the key element of why she has been so lauded over the course of her increasingly mature career: A groove. In fact, [LP1] lacks so much of a groove, it would be safe to say the singer has almost completely abandoned her soulful roots altogether", deeming the result "disappointing", "low-rent", "unexpected" and "most of all, it seems like something Joss Stone was previously above".

Caryn Ganz of Rolling Stone commented that "Stone is best when she's rawest, bookending LP1 with 'Newborn' and 'Take Good Care,' stripped-down tunes where her howl goes from plaintive to bone-shaking in a few lovesick heartbeats." Andy Gill of The Independent remarked that the album is "less hostage to a single specific style than any of her previous work" and that "the diversity emphasises her shared heritage with Janis Joplin, while retaining her core deep-soul strength on tracks such as 'Cry Myself to Sleep' and 'Newborn'." Matthew Cole from Slant Magazine felt that "sameness is [...] an issue [for the album], as most of the songs here aspire to little more than providing scenery for Stone's vocals." He continued: "This a wholly acceptable effort, but it makes it clear that Stone is stalling out a mere decade into what looked at first like a promising career." Mikael Wood of the Los Angeles Times viewed it as "Stone's most conventional record yet" and opined that "the music gestures toward the majestic balladry we've heard a lot of lately from Ryan Tedder in his productions for Beyoncé and Kelly Clarkson. But such a mild reward hardly seems worth the trouble of her protracted freedom fight." Kenny Herzog from The A.V. Club was emphatic, dubbing it Stone's "flattest and phoniest album yet" and "an almost shockingly forgettable slab of forced adult-contemporary rock", adding that "[d]espite a capable vocal range, Stone primarily dials up screechy wails [...] and contrived, finger-wagging sass." Joanne Huffa from Now argued that "[d]ated production could be overlooked if the songs were better, but there's a serious lack of hooks for a pop album. And since Stone's voice is the focal point, there's no escaping the leaden lyrics."

Commercial performance
LP1 debuted and peaked at number 36 on the UK Albums Chart. In the United States, it debuted at number nine on the Billboard 200 with first-week sales of 30,000 copies, becoming Stone's third consecutive top-10 album on the chart, as well as her second highest-peaking album after Introducing Joss Stone (2007).

In June 2012, the album was awarded a gold certification from the Independent Music Companies Association (IMPALA), indicating sales in excess of 75,000 copies across Europe.

Track listing

Personnel
Credits adapted from the liner notes of LP1.

Musicians
 Joss Stone – vocals
 Dave Stewart – guitar
 Chad Cromwell – drums, percussion
 Michael Rhodes – bass
 Tom Bukovac – guitar
 Dan Dugmore – pedal steel guitars
 Mike Rojas – keys
 Drea Rhenee – background vocals
 Wendy Moten – background vocals
 Luke Potter – additional guitars on "Karma"

Technical
 Dave Stewart – production
 Joss Stone – production, executive production
 Dave Kaplan – executive production
 Brian Nelson – executive production
 John McBride – engineering
 Steve Greenwell – mixing, additional engineering
 Tom Coyne – mastering at Sterling Sound (New York City)

Artwork
 Kristin Burns – photography
 Dave Stewart – cover photo
 Kevin Tetreault – layout, design

Charts

Weekly charts

Year-end charts

Release history

References

2011 albums
Albums produced by David A. Stewart
Blues albums by English artists
Joss Stone albums
Rock albums by English artists
Surfdog Records albums